The following television stations broadcast on digital or analog channel 33 in Canada:

 CBOFT-DT in Ottawa, Ontario
 CFTF-DT-8 in Les Escoumins, Quebec
 CICO-DT-59 in Chatham, Ontario
 CKVU-DT in Vancouver, British Columbia

33 TV stations in Canada